Aureopteryx olufsoni is a moth in the family Crambidae described by Maria Alma Solis and David Adamski in 1998. It is found in the southern Atlantic and Pacific lowlands of Costa Rica.

The length of the forewings is 5.5–6.7 mm. The ground colour of the forewings is pale yellow with three silver streaks within a yellow apical area. The hindwings are pale yellow with a pale brown subterminal line.

References

Moths described in 1998
Glaphyriinae
Moths of Central America